The 2013–14 Western Sydney Wanderers FC W-League season was the club's second participation in the W-League, since the club's formation in 2012.

Season overview

Players

Squad information

Transfers in

Transfers out

Technical staff

Squad statistics

Disciplinary record

Goal scorers

Competitions

W-League

League table

Results summary

Results by round

Matches

Awards
 Player of the Week (Round 6) – Shawna Gordon

References

External links
 Official website

Western Sydney Wanderers FC (A-League Women) seasons
Western Sydney